The Cardiff Huskies are a sledge hockey team based in Cardiff, Wales. The team was started by Andy McNulty and David "Jamo" James. The team is believed to be the oldest sledge hockey team in the UK. The Cardiff Huskies is the only sledge hockey team in Wales. The team is part of the BSHA (British Sledge Hockey Association).

The team is one of the main teams that champions adults, children, male athletes and female athletes, on the Huskies roster. The Huskies is one of the main teams that help raise awareness of sledge hockey in the British Isles, as a way of getting more players and more teams created. Kingston Kestrels is another team that advertises sledge hockey in the British Isles.

The Cardiff Huskies used to train in the Welsh National Ice Rink. Demolished in 2006 to build the St. David's 2 shopping centre, and specifically the John Lewis department store, they now play and train at Ice Arena Wales, Cardiff Bay, which is also home to the Cardiff Devils. The Huskies train on a Sunday night.

References 
Official Cardiff Sledge Hockey Website

cardiffhuskies.com Official website for Cardiff Huskies Para Ice Hockey Team

Parasports teams
Ice hockey teams in Wales
Sledge hockey
Sport in Cardiff